Liaobaatar changi is a multituberculate which existed in China during the lower Cretaceous period. It is the only species in the genus Liaobaatar.

Etymology
The name Liaobaatar indicates the site where the material referred to this genus has been discovered, the Province of Liaoning in China, plus the Mongolian suffix "baatar"= hero often used for multituberculates classification.

References

Multituberculates
Cretaceous mammals
Fossil taxa described in 2009
Prehistoric animals of China
Prehistoric mammal genera